The 12 Hours of Reims (official name: 12 Heures internationales de Reims) were a sports car endurance racing series held from 1953 to 1967 at the circuit Reims (Gueux).

Race report 

 Championnat du Monde des Constructeurs - Trophée France-Amérique, Les 12 Heures Internationales de Reims
 July 5, 1964,  Circuit Reims (France), 8.302 km,  World Sportscar Championship (round 10)
 Classes Prototypes: +3000 cc (P+3.0), 3000 cc (P3.0), 2000 cc (P2.0) 1300 cc (P1.3)
 Classes Grand Touring: +3000 cc (GT+3.0), 3000 cc (GT3.0), 2000 cc (GT2.0), 1300 cc (GT1.3)
 Pole Position overall:  #8 Ferrari 250 LM,  John Surtees, 2:19.2 - 214.681 km/h (133.396 mph)
 Fastest Lap overall:    #7 Ferrari 250 LM,  Graham Hill, 2:19.2 - 214.681 km/h (133.396 mph)

Results overall

Winners by class

References 

12 Hours of Reims
12 Hours of Reims